The ZHC is a test held by the Ministry of Human Resources and Social Security of the People's Republic of China to test Chinese citizens' proficiency in Mandarin Chinese.

Purpose and history 

This exam tests the candidates’ ability to use Chinese in their professional activities. Those who pass the test are issued the certificate of occupational Chinese testing: elementary level, intermediate level or advanced level.

ZHC was formally launched in 2004. It is held on the second Sunday in March, June, September and December annually.

See also 
 Hanyu Shuiping Kaoshi – a test for non-native speakers administered by China
 Test of Chinese as a Foreign Language – a test for non-native speakers administered by Taiwan
 List of language proficiency tests

References

External links
Official Website 

Standard Chinese
Chinese language tests